Lura may refer to:
y tế

People
Lura (singer) (born 1975), a Portuguese singer and musician, of Cape Verdean descent
Lura Lynn Ryan (1934–2011), the First Lady of the U.S. state of Illinois from 1999 to 2003
Lura Eugenie Brown Smith (1864–?), American journalist, newspaper editor, author
Lura S. Tally (1921–2012), American politician and educator from North Carolina
Michael Lura (1948–2004), American politician from Iowa

Places

Albania
Lura, or Lurë, a former municipality in the Dibër County, northeastern Albania
Lura National Park, a national park located in the municipality of Dibër in northeastern Albania

China
Lura, Tibet, a village in the Tibet Autonomous Region of China

Italy
, a stream in Italy, a tributary of the Olona

Norway
Lura, Norway, a borough of the city of Sandnes in Rogaland county, Norway

United States
Lura Lake, a lake in Blue Earth and Faribault counties in Minnesota, USA
Lura Township, Faribault County, Minnesota, a township in Minnesota, USA

See also
Lura Formation, a geological formation in western China 
Lura Building, a building in Mayville, North Dakota, USA that was built in 1900
LuraTech, a software company which makes products for handling and conversion of digital documents
Loura (disambiguation)
Iura (disambiguation)